Fra Grgo Martić (1822 – 30 August 1905), also known as Grga or Mate Martić, was a Bosnian friar and writer in the Franciscan Province of Bosna Srebrena.

Biography
Martić was born in Rastovača village near Posušje, Eyalet of Bosnia, Ottoman Empire. He was educated in Zagreb and Pest, and ordained on Christmas Day, 1844. He served for three years in Kreševo and Osova.

From 1851 to 1879 he served as a parish priest in Sarajevo. As a friar of the Franciscan Province of Bosna Srebrena, Martić served the majority of his life, and carried out most of his work while at the Franciscan monastery St. Catharine in Kreševo.

In his youth he was a supporter of Illyrian movement as a nationalist and romanticist, before switching to a more moderate view. 

Martić worked as a writer and translator, translating works of Homer and Goethe into the Bosnian language. At the time of the Austro-Hungarian occupation of Bosnia and Herzegovina, he was politically active on behalf of the Catholics of Bosnia and Herzegovina.

Influences and legacy
He opened a school in Kreševo in 1847 and a gymnasium in Sarajevo. His best-known literary work was Osvetnici, an epic about the struggle against Ottoman rule.
Martić made contributions to Albanian culture as well, influencing young Albanian writer Gjergj Fishta who attended Franciscan schools in Kreševo where he met Martić and Croatian writer Silvije Strahimir Kranjčević, who at that time also lived in Bosnia.

 His life has also been commemorated with a postage stamp from Bosnia and Herzegovina.
 Central place in Old Town of Sarajevo, in front of the Sarajevo Cathedral, bears the name of fra Grgo Martić.
 A monument in his honor is erected in front of a church in Posušje. while another is also erected in Zagreb.
 A commemorative stone cross with a plaque stands in the village Rastovača noting his birthplace, his life and his work.

Literary works
 Slavodobitnica svijetlomu gospodaru Omer-paši (epic poem, 1852) 
 Narodne pjesme bosanske i hercegovačke (with Ivan Frano Jukić), I (1858) 
 Osvetnici, I-III (ep, 1861/65.), IV (1878.), V (1881.), VI (1881.), VII (1883) 
 Početni zemljopis za katoličke učionice u Bosni (epic poem, 1884) 
 Narodne pjesme o boju na Kosovu godine 1389 (1886) 
 Obrana Biograda godine 1456 (ep, 1887) 
 Pjesnička djela fra Grge Martića, 1-7 (1888) 
 Pjesnička djela fra Grge Martića, I (1893) 
 Zapamćenja/1829-1878, po kazivanju autorovu zabilježio janko Koharić (1906.) 
 Izabrani spisi (1956)

References

1822 births
1905 deaths
People from Posušje
Franciscans of the Franciscan Province of Bosnia
19th-century Bosnia and Herzegovina Roman Catholic priests
Bosnia and Herzegovina writers
Bosnia and Herzegovina essayists